The Bily Taylor Trio with Candido is an album by American jazz pianist Billy Taylor's trio with Cuban percussionist Candido Camero featuring tracks recorded in 1954 for the Prestige label.

Reception

Allmusic reviewer Stephen Cook stated: "A very nice program of Latin-tinged bop numbers".

Track listing
All compositions by Billy Taylor, except where noted.
 "Mambo Inn" (Mario Bauzá, Edgar Sampson, Bobby Woodlen) – 4:51
 "Bit of Bedlam" – 5:14
 "Declivity" – 4:41
 "Love for Sale" (Cole Porter) – 7:46
 "A Live One" – 2:50
 "Different Bells" – 6:30

Personnel 
Billy Taylor – piano
Earl May – bass
Charlie Smith – drums
Candido Camero – congas

References 

1955 albums
Billy Taylor albums
Candido Camero albums
Albums recorded at Van Gelder Studio
Albums produced by Bob Weinstock
Prestige Records albums